Ensemble Mik Nawooj is a San Francisco Bay Area-based musical group that merges classical, jazz, and hip hop styles. They are best known for The Great Integration, their "chamber hip hop opera."

Members
Classically trained composer and pianist JooWan Kim founded Ensemble Mik Nawooj in 2005. In 2010, after 5 years of hiatus, Kim co-founded Golden Fetus Records to push the group independently.

Current members include:
Sandman - MC
Anne Hepburn Smith - Soprano
Joyce Lee - Flute
Andrew Friedman - Clarinet
Clare Armenante - Violin
Evan Kahn/Bridget Pasker - Cello
Eugene Theriault - Bass
LJ Alexander - Drums

Acclaim
The Great Integration was voted the #1 R&B/Hip-Hop album of February 2010 by Pirate Cat Radio, and the group has received acclaim from jazz artist Ahmad Jamal.

References

Musical groups from San Francisco